Philip Eustace Stretton (1865–1919) was a British animal and sporting painter working between 1882 until his death.

Stretton painted in oils and watercolour and exhibited at the Royal Academy between 1884 and 1904. Stretton was a follower of Sir Edwin Landseer, whose animal paintings had an enormous impact on Stretton.

References

External links
 goldenagepaintings.blogspot.com
 

1865 births
1919 deaths
19th-century English painters
English male painters
20th-century English painters
Animal artists
20th-century English male artists
19th-century English male artists